Niko Klaus Petteri Kapanen (born 29 April 1978) is a Finnish former professional ice hockey centre, who last played for HPK of the Finnish Liiga.

Playing career
Kapanen was drafted by the Dallas Stars in the 6th round as the 173rd overall pick in the 1998 NHL Entry Draft.  During the 2005–06 season, Kapanen recorded a career high in goals (14) and points (35). He scored his first career hat-trick on February 9, 2006 against the Phoenix Coyotes in a 5–1 victory.

On June 24, 2006, Kapanen was traded by the Stars to the Atlanta Thrashers, along with 7th round draft pick in 2006, for defenceman Jaroslav Modrý and centerman Patrik Štefan. During his first season with the Thrashers, Kapanen was picked up off the waiver list by the Phoenix Coyotes.

On June 9, 2008, Kapanen left the NHL and signed for Ak Bars Kazan of the Kontinental Hockey League.

After five seasons with Ak Bars, Kapanen left as a free agent to sign a multi-year contract with Czech club HC Lev Praha of the KHL on August 11, 2013. Hampered by injury, Kapanen had a less than successful regular 2013–14 season with Praha, but redeemed himself in playoffs to post 11 points in 21 games as Lev reached the Gagarin Cup finals.

Kapanen association with Lev was ended after one-year upon the club announcing financial bankruptcy. On July 10, 2014, Kapanen signed a one-year contract with new Finnish KHL entrant, Jokerit.

International play

Kapanen had a highly decorated international career with Finland in collecting a medal at every level played. He made his debut as a junior in the 1997 World Junior Championships, claiming a gold medal at the following junior Championships in 1998. At the senior men's level Kapanen competed in 9 World Championships in capturing 5 medals, including a gold at the 2011 World Championships.  He twice represented Finland at the Winter Olympics claiming a Silver and Bronze at the 2006 and 2010  tournaments respectively.

Career statistics

Regular season and playoffs

International

Awards and honours

References

External links

Living people
1978 births
Ak Bars Kazan players
Atlanta Thrashers players
Dallas Stars draft picks
Dallas Stars players
EV Zug players
Finnish expatriate ice hockey players in Russia
Finnish ice hockey centres
HPK players
Ice hockey players at the 2006 Winter Olympics
Ice hockey players at the 2010 Winter Olympics
Jokerit players
HC Lev Praha players
Medalists at the 2010 Winter Olympics
Medalists at the 2006 Winter Olympics
Olympic bronze medalists for Finland
Olympic ice hockey players of Finland
Olympic medalists in ice hockey
Olympic silver medalists for Finland
People from Hattula
Phoenix Coyotes players
HC TPS players
Utah Grizzlies (AHL) players
Sportspeople from Kanta-Häme
Finnish expatriate ice hockey players in the United States
Finnish expatriate ice hockey players in the Czech Republic
Finnish expatriate ice hockey players in Switzerland